Larisa Polivoda (born December 16, 1963) is a former Ukrainian butterfly swimmer who competed for the former Soviet Union at the 1980 Summer Olympics, competing in the 200 metre and 100 metre events.

She was a member of Meteor Sport Club in the city of Dnipropetrovsk.

Polivoda representеd USSR at the 1979 Tokyo World Cup, and in international meets with USA, UK, and East Germany. She became a National Champion in 1980 and 1981. Her butterfly style was distinguished by extremely fast beginning and seemingly effortless technique.

References
 Larisa Polivoda profile at Sports-Reference.com
 Polidova at the 49th USSR Summer Swim Meet (in Russian)

Russian female swimmers
Soviet female swimmers
Olympic swimmers of the Soviet Union
Swimmers at the 1980 Summer Olympics
1963 births
Living people